Danielle Jones (born 4 March 1969) is a former professional tennis player from Australia.

Biography
Jones comes from Melbourne and as a junior was runner-up in the girls' doubles at the 1987 Australian Open.

She competed on the professional tour in the 1990s. At the 1991 Australian Open she appeared in the singles main draw as a wildcard, where she lost in the first round to Larisa Savchenko-Neiland. Her best singles performance on the WTA Tour was a quarterfinal appearance at the Taipei Women's Championship in 1993, beating Cammy MacGregor and Rachel McQuillan en route. She had a win over then-world No. 23, Amy Frazier, at Eastbourne in 1994.

In doubles, she reached as high as 91 in the world in 1997 and was a semifinalist at the Auckland Open, partnering Esmé de Villiers. She featured in the main draw of the doubles at all four Grand Slam tournaments, which included seven Australian Open appearances.

ITF Circuit finals

Singles (0–1)

Doubles (14–6)

References

External links
 
 

1969 births
Living people
Australian female tennis players
Tennis players from Melbourne
20th-century Australian women